Yang Ning (Chinese 杨宁 born in 1962) is a Chinese former football goalkeeper who played for Guangdong and the Chinese national team who he represented in the 1984 Asian Cup.

Career
Yang Ning grew up into a football family and quickly rose through the ranks before he graduated into the senior team of Guangdong within the 1978 Chinese league season. The following season he went on to be part of the team that went on to win the 1979 Chinese league title. This soon saw him called up to the Chinese national team in 1980, which made him the youngest goalkeeper ever to be included in the national team. He was  then included in the squad that played within the 1982 Asian Games before being the first-choice goalkeeper that came runners-up within the 1984 AFC Asian Cup. After playing in the 1986 Asian Games he retired several years later and moved to San Francisco.

Career statistics

International statistics

Honours
Chinese Jia-A League: 1979

References

External links
Team China Stats

1962 births
Living people
Chinese footballers
Hakka sportspeople
Footballers from Meizhou
China international footballers
Association football goalkeepers